Horatio Nelson Davis (June 17, 1812February 15, 1907) was an American banker, Republican politician, and Wisconsin pioneer.  He was the 13th and 15th mayor of Beloit, Wisconsin, and represented Rock County in the Wisconsin State Senate for four years.  He was the father of Cushman Kellogg Davis, who served as a U.S. senator and Governor of Minnesota.

Biography
Davis was born in Henderson, New York. During the American Civil War, he was commissioned a captain in the Union Army for the commissary and subsistence department.  At the end of the war, he received an honorary brevet to major. Afterwards, he became a bank president. His son, Cushman Kellogg Davis, became a member of the United States Senate and Governor of Minnesota.

Political career
Davis represented the 17th District in the Senate during the 1873, 1874, 1875 and 1876 sessions. Other positions he held include Mayor of Beloit, Wisconsin from 1873 to 1877. He was a Republican.

Davis was alive to celebrate his 50th wedding anniversary in 1887, and to receive his son on the family farm in 1890. Davis died in Buffalo, New York at the age of 94, having "retained his mental and physical faculties almost to the end".

References

External links
The Political Graveyard
Geni.com

People from Henderson, New York
Politicians from Beloit, Wisconsin
Republican Party Wisconsin state senators
Mayors of places in Wisconsin
People of Wisconsin in the American Civil War
Union Army officers
American bank presidents
1812 births
1907 deaths
19th-century American politicians
19th-century American businesspeople